Jimena Elías Roca (born February 1, 1989 in Ica, Peru) is the Miss Peru Universo 2007.

Elías won the Miss Teen Peru 2005 Pageant and represented Peru in the Miss Teen International pageant and placed as 1st Runner up. She was elected Miss Peru Universo 2007 on April 16, 2007. She was handpicked by the Corporacion Nacional de la Belleza who is in charge of sending their delegate to Miss Universe and other minor pageants. On May 2, Elías traveled to Mexico City, Mexico to compete in the Miss Universe 2007 pageant which was held on May 28. She did not place.

References

External links

Living people
People from Ica Region
Miss Universe 2007 contestants
Peruvian female models
1989 births
Peruvian beauty pageant winners
Peruvian child models
21st-century Peruvian women